was a Japanese wrestler. He competed in the men's freestyle lightweight at the 1936 Summer Olympics.

References

External links
 

1916 births
2001 deaths
Japanese male sport wrestlers
Olympic wrestlers of Japan
Wrestlers at the 1936 Summer Olympics
Place of birth missing
Presidents of the Japan Wrestling Federation